The Agra Subah was a subah of the Mughal Empire, established in the reign of Emperor Akbar and one of the empire's core territories until it was eclipsed by the rapidly expanding Maratha Empire. To the north it bordered Delhi and Awadh, to the east Allahabad, and to the south and west Malwa and Ajmer. Its capital was at Agra, an important administrative center of the empire which was expanded under Mughal rule.

Administrative divisions
The province was divided into 13 sarkars during the reign of Akbar.

Subahdars

Under Shah Jahan 

Qasim Khan

Wazir Khan

Islam Khan

Safdar Khan

Syed Khan Jahan

Azam Khan

Saif Khan

Raja Bethal Das

Shaikh Farid

Others 
Qasim Khan Juvayni

Wazir Khan (Lahore), 1628-1631

Rajaram II of Satara

Reference

Mughal subahs
History of Agra